Galatasaray is a monthly released official magazine to the fans of Turkish sports club Galatasaray SK. The magazine was first released on 1 June 2002. It is the first official sports club magazine in Turkey.

Galatasaray was the best selling sports club magazine in Turkey (100,000 copies monthly) in 2009.

References

External links
News from Galatasaray

2002 establishments in Turkey
Association football magazines
Galatasaray S.K.
Magazines established in 2002
Magazines published in Istanbul
Monthly magazines published in Turkey
Sports mass media in Turkey
Turkish-language magazines